Monorierdő is a village in Pest County, Hungary.

The village was a site of the Monorierdő train collision in 2008.

References

Populated places in Pest County